DQ8 may refer to:
Dragon Quest VIII, a 2004 role-playing game.
HLA-DQ8, an HLA-DQ receptor serotype associated with coeliac disease.